International Survivors of Suicide Loss Day is designated by the United States Congress as a day when the friends and family of those who have died by suicide can join together for healing and support. This day always falls on the Saturday before American Thanksgiving.

In 1999, Senator Harry Reid introduced a resolution to the United States Senate which led to the creation of National Survivors of Suicide Day. Reid is a survivor of his father's suicide. 

Every year, the American Foundation for Suicide Prevention sponsors International Survivors of Suicide Loss Day, a program that unites survivors of suicide loss across the world. These events help survivors cope with the tragedy of losing someone to suicide.

References

External links
 Official website at the American Foundation for Suicide Prevention

Recurring events established in 1999
November observances
Observances in the United States
Suicide in the United States
United States federal legislation
Observances based on the date of Thanksgiving (United States)
Saturday observances
Holidays and observances by scheduling (nth weekday of the month)
Health awareness days